Philipp Collin (born ) is a former German male volleyball player. He is part of the Germany men's national volleyball team. On club level he plays for  VFB Friedrichshafen.

References

External links
 profile at FIVB.org

1990 births
Living people
German men's volleyball players
Place of birth missing (living people)
21st-century German people